The 1971–72 Divizia C was the 16th season of Liga III, the third tier of the Romanian football league system.

Team changes

To Divizia C
Relegated from Divizia B
 Metrom Brașov
 Flacăra Moreni
 UM Timișoara
 Vagonul Arad

Promoted from County Championship

 Avântul Frasin
 Victoria PTTR Botoșani
 Constructorul Iași
 Danubiana Roman
 Viitorul Vaslui
 Oituz Târgu Ocna
 Luceafărul Focșani
 Gloria Tecuci
 Granitul Babadag
 Șantierul Naval Constanța
 Dunărea Brăila
 Dinamo Obor București
 Victoria Lehliu
 Metalul Oțelu Roșu
 Minerul Rovinari
 Progresul Strehaia
 Sporting Roșiori
 Muscelul Câmpulung
 Rapid Piatra Olt
 Unirea Bujoreni

 Chimia Buzău
 Aurora Urziceni
 Viitorul Slănic
 Gloria Mija
 Gloria Arad
 Progresul Timișoara
 UPA Sibiu
 Textila Sebeș
 Constructorul Hunedoara
 Voința Carei
 Minerul Cavnic
 Măgura Șimleu Silvaniei
 Bihoreana Marghita
 Minerul Rodna
 Tehnofrig Cluj-Napoca
 Viitorul Târgu Mureș
 Politehnica Brașov
 Carpați Covasna
 Miercurea Ciuc

From Divizia C
Promoted to Divizia B
 Chimia Râmnicu Vâlcea
 Vulturii Textila Lugoj
 Metalul Plopeni
 Chimia Făgăraș

Relegated to County Championship
 —

Renamed teams
Penicilina Iași was renamed as Unirea Iași.

Rarăul Câmpulung Moldovenesc was renamed as ASA Câmpulung Moldovenesc.

Muncitorul Tecuci was renamed as URA Tecuci.

Electronica București was renamed as Electronica Obor București.

Unirea București was renamed as Unirea Tricolor București.

FC Caracal was renamed as Răsăritul Caracal.

Gloria Slatina was renamed as Oltul Slatina.

Lemnarul Odorheiu Secuiesc was renamed as Textila Odorheiu Secuiesc.

Gloria Mija was renamed as Metalul Mija.

Chimistul Baia Mare was renamed as Topitorul Baia Mare.

Other teams
Metalul Buzău was replaced by the newly formed Gloria Buzău.

Unirea Bujoreni was replaced by Oltul Râmnicu Vâlcea.

League tables

Seria I

Seria II

Seria III

Seria IV

Seria V

Seria VI

Seria VII

Seria VIII

Seria IX

Seria X

Seria XI

Seria XII

Promotion play-off

Group I

Group II

Group III

Group IV

See also 

 1971–72 Divizia A
 1971–72 Divizia B
 1971–72 County Championship

References 

Liga III seasons
3
Romania